Majaa Talkies (Kannada: ಮಜಾ ಟಾಕೀಸ್) is an Indian sketch comedy show that premiered on ETV Kannada (now Colors Kannada) on 7 February 2015. The episodes focus on comical scripts and usually feature celebrity guests who are invited on the show to promote their latest films in the comedy-focused talk show format. The show became Karnataka's highest rated scripted TV show in June 2015. As of September 2015, the show achieved maximum TRP and clinched the number one spot in Kannada television.

The show is hosted and directed by Srujan Lokesh, a popular artist of the Kannada Cinema. The format of the show was said to be based on a popular Hindi show aired on Colors TV, Comedy Nights with Kapil hosted by Kapil Sharma. However, Srujan Lokesh considers it as a sequel to Maja with Sruja, a comedy show that aired on Asianet Suvarna during 2010-11, hosted by Srujan himself.

The cast of the show includes filmmaker Indrajit Lankesh as a permanent celebrity judge and  few veterans in the field of Kannada Cinema and Theatre such as Mimicry Dayanand, V Manohar and Mandya Ramesh. V Manohar has also composed the title song for the show. The set for the show has been created at Kanteerava Studios, Bengaluru and episodes are shot here. The show broadcasts on Saturdays and Sundays on Colors Kannada at 8:00 PM IST. All episodes will also become available online in full length on the official YouTube channel of Colors Kannada and the online streaming platform Voot after the original airing. Since Colors Kannada launched the HD simulcast version of the channel on 1 May 2016, Majaa Talkies is now available in HD format also. Episode 124 was the first episode to be aired in HD. The show has seen almost all celebrities of Kannada film industry. The 25th episode was attended by Sudeep. 50th episode - Darshan . 75th episode - Arjun Sarja and Dhruva Sarja. 100th episode - Shiva Rajkumar. 150th episode - Shubha Poonja and Nabha Natesh. 200th episode was celebrated very grandly and a series of actors and actresses were a part of the grand celebration. 250th episode - Puneeth Rajkumar. Currently season 2 is On-Air Named Majaa Takies Super Season

Cast

The cast of the show mainly contains Srujan Lokesh, Indrajit Lankesh, Shwetha Chengappa, Aparna, Mimicry Dayanand and V Manohar with permanent characters. Pavan Kumar, Rajashekhar and many other artists have no fixed character and play different characters as per the scripts. Mandya Ramesh, Kuri Prathap and Naveen Padil were added to the main cast later in the show with permanent characters. Recurring cast with fixed characters include Vandana Dayanand and Rajini. The table below briefs about the cast and characters in detail.

Characters are listed in the order of their introduction on the show.

Band
The band of the show is referred as Noise Pollution by Srujan. Rekha Mohan (referred as ReMo) leads the band and she has appeared in most of the episodes. She sings various songs, sometimes with adaptions to the original lyrics suitable for the script. She often gets involved as a part of the script in the show. Usha Kokila has taken the lead in the absence of ReMo a few times. The band includes Mohan Karkala with the keyboard, Kamal Bob with the rhythm pad and two guitarists. ReMo and Mohan are often included in staged segments and are usually taunted at by Srujan on the show. Other artists have also performed along with ReMo in the band.

House set

From the inaugural episode, the show is shot in a set resembling a house created at Kanteerava Studios at Bengaluru. The set depicts a typical living area of a modern house complete with luxury seating for guests, a wall of the room which is said to be Rani's, through the door of which she usually enters the hall, a kitchen, a staircase connecting to the upper part of the house where Rajini is shown to be living in. Multiple ways exist to enter the hall; including the back hallway behind the seating through which Srujan usually enters. An area beside kitchen is reserved for the band and a solo seating is placed for Indrajith Lankesh to the opposite of the main set.

The set was revamped from episode 150 and an entirely new house was created reflecting a luxurious apartment. It is said that the people behind the creation of the new set were the same who worked on the set of Comedy Nights with Kapil. The new set appears bigger than the old one with inclusions of a new fireplace behind the guest seating, new entry points and a new staircase. A television appears above the new fireplace. The kitchen has been removed and a large window is placed in the background wall.

Episodes

The episodes are usually one hour long with commercials, air from 8:00 PM to 9:00 PM on weekends. The format followed included a scripted act from the cast in the initial segment followed by the segment that introduced and interacted with the guests invited for the episode. This was slightly altered after the introduction of the new house for the show where the guests are now introduced at the beginning and all the scripted acts proceed with them in the background, sometimes involving them. The guests usually would be from an upcoming movie for its promotion through the show. Apart from movie promotions, the show also features guests from other respects.

The show often airs two-hour special episodes touted as 'Mega Episodes' from 8:00 PM to 10:00 PM. The episode run time would be around 90 minutes excluding the commercial slots. This is usually done when the timeslot for the next day's episode would be unavailable due to various reasons. Some one-hour episodes continue for the next day, making them a two-day special episodes. Several special episodes and crossovers in conjunction with other shows broadcast on Colors Kannada have also been aired.

It was earlier said in a press meet that there will be 104 episodes in the first season by Srujan Lokesh himself. However, the show has crossed 104 episodes.

Special episodes and spin-offs

Awards and nominations

Sponsorships
The show had numerous sponsors from the launch. The usual pattern followed included a primary and a secondary sponsor for the show. For few episodes, the show even grabbed two secondary sponsors when the viewership was at its peak.

Trivia

 Majaa Talkies is Srujan Lokesh's second comedy show after Maja with Sruja which was aired during 2010-11.
 The show is Srujan Lokesh's first directorial initiative.
 This is the fourth production for Lokesh Productions, however first of its genre, the three other productions being game shows and reality shows. 
 Vandana Dayanand, who plays Honey, the daughter of Dayanand, is the real life daughter of Mimicry Dayanand.
 Arun Sagar and Srujan Lokesh who were the pioneers of sketch comedy in Kannada; have been the contestants of Season 1 and Season 2 of Bigg Boss Kannada respectively, both ending up as runners-up.
 The show contains references to Sunny Leone very often. Indrajith Lankesh is often teased as brother of Sunny by Srujan. This is because Indrajith directed a movie in which Sunny Leone was roped in to perform in an item number with Srujan Lokesh.

History
During 2009-10, director Vijaya Prasad who was well known for his famous directorial venture Silli Lalli put Srujan Lokesh in the lead and started a satire comedy show called Maja with Sruja which was aired on Asianet Suvarna Though Vijaya Prasad appeared in few episodes, his identity was never revealed in the show. Srujan Lokesh hosted the show and veterans like Mimicry Dayanand, Arun Sagar and Antony Kamal were a part of the comedy focused talk show. Celebrities were being invited for casual talk as well as film promotions. The show ended in 2011 despite being highly appreciated by the viewers. Srujan Lokesh hinted about a new season in the finale episode of Maja with Sruja but this did not happen. Srujan Lokesh then became busy with his home production Lokesh Productions and produced different shows including Kaasige Toss and Chota Champion. He also hosted and judged a cookery reality show Kitchen Kiladigalu with Sihi Kahi Chandru in 2012. Later in 2013, Arun Sagar was roped in as a contestant for Season 1 of Bigg Boss Kannada by ETV Kannada where he stood out as the runner-up of the season. Vijaya Prasad started another sketch comedy show on ETV Kannada titled Comedy Circle with Arun Sagar, after he came back from the Bigg Boss house, Though this show appeared to be reincarnation of Maja with Sruja with all the recurring characters, it missed Srujan Lokesh on the show. The casting was expanded for the show, which included Arun Sagar, Shalini Sathyanarayan, Mimicry Dayanand, Antony Kamal, Mimicry Gopi, Mithra, and Girija Lokesh (Srujan Lokesh's mother) in the main cast. For unknown reasons, Arun Sagar was present only for first few episodes. Later, Shalini took up the hosting for Comedy Circle and the show successfully completed around 40 episodes. It is notable that, during the telecast of Comedy Circle, Srujan Lokesh was inside the Bigg Boss house as a contestant for the Season 2 of Bigg Boss Kannada which was aired on Asianet Suvarna. Srujan also ended up as the runner-up of the season.

References

External links

Indian television shows
Kannada-language television shows
2015 Indian television series debuts
Colors Kannada original programming